The Brunei Open was an Asian Tour golf tournament. The 2005 staging was Brunei's first ever professional golf tournament, and it was won by Terry Pilkadaris of Australia. The event is held at the Jack Nicklaus-designed course at the Empire Hotel and Country Club. In 2010 the prize fund was US$300,000.

Winners

External links
Coverage on Asian Tour's official site

Former Asian Tour events
Golf tournaments in Brunei
Recurring sporting events established in 2005
Recurring sporting events disestablished in 2010
Defunct sports competitions in Brunei